The women's 3000 metres event at the 1986 World Junior Championships in Athletics was held in Athens, Greece, at Olympic Stadium on 17 and 19 July.

Medalists

Results

Final
19 July

Heats
17 July

Heat 1

Heat 2

Participation
According to an unofficial count, 28 athletes from 20 countries participated in the event.

References

3000 metres
Long distance running at the World Athletics U20 Championships